Bondia fidelis is a moth in the family Carposinidae. It was described by Edward Meyrick in 1913. It is found in North America, where it has been recorded from Arizona and Colorado.

Adults have been recorded on wing from July to August.

References

Carposinidae
Moths described in 1913
Moths of North America